Holy Defense cinema refers to a genre of Iranian films that deals with various aspects of the Iran-Iraq war of 1980–1988. Although little noticed in the West, the genre has produced more than 200 movies, including some critical and commercial hits. Some of Iran's most noted directors have engaged with the genre, among them Ebrahim Hatamikia, Mohsen Makhmalbaf, Majid Majidi and Kamal Tabrizi. Hatamikia is one of the most prolific and successful proponents of the genre. 

In 2007, Iranian war cinema retrospectives were curated by Pedram Khosronejad and held in New York and at the Barbican Centre in London. The first comprehensive academic study in the West was published in 2012: Iranian Holy Defence Cinema: Religion, Martyrdom and National Identity by Pedram Khosronejad.

Notable directors 
 Ebrahim Hatamikia
 Mohammad Bozorgnia
 Rasoul Mollagholipour
 Shahriar Bahrani
 Ahmad Reza Darvish
 Mohsen Makhmalbaf
 Abolqasem Talebi
 Kamal Tabrizi

Notable films
The 5th Kilometer, 1980
Jan-bazan, 1981
A Military Base in Hell, 1982
Hesar, 1983
Rahaei, 1983
Two Blind Eyes, 1983
A Boat to the Beach, 1984
Land of Lovers, 1984
Eagles, 1984
The First Bell, 1984
We Are Standing, 1984
The Flag Bearer, 1985
Passage, 1986
Identity, 1987
Man and Weapon, 1988
Horizon, 1989
Transition, 1989
Snake Fang, 1989
The Scout, 1989
Bashu, the Little Stranger, 1990
The Immigrant, 1990
The Glass Eye, 1991
The Sergeant, 1991
Union of the Good, 1992
The Abadanis, 1993
From Karkheh to Rhein, 1993
Journey to Chazabeh, 1996

References

Sources

Further reading 
 
 
 
 

Lists of Iranian films